Prosheliomyia is a genus of bristle flies in the family Tachinidae.

Subgenera & Species
Subgenus Prosheliomyia Brauer & von Bergenstamm, 1891
Prosheliomyia brevinervis (Malloch, 1935)
Prosheliomyia formosensis (Townsend, 1927)
Prosheliomyia nietneri Brauer & von Bergenstamm, 1891
Prosheliomyia sibuyana (Townsend, 1928)
Subgenus Thrixionellus Mesnil, 1968
Prosheliomyia mirabilis Mesnil, 1968
Prosheliomyia nigricornis Mesnil, 1968
Prosheliomyia pallida Mesnil, 1968

References

Diptera of Asia
Diptera of Africa
Dexiinae
Tachinidae genera
Taxa named by Friedrich Moritz Brauer
Taxa named by Julius von Bergenstamm